Marcus Helligkilde (born 5 October 1996) is a Danish professional golfer. In 2021, he won the Vierumäki Finnish Challenge and Swiss Challenge on the Challenge Tour and finished the season as the winner of the Challenge Tour Rankings.

Career
As an amateur, Helligkilde won the 2015 Turkish Amateur Open Championship and represented Denmark at the 2016 Eisenhower Trophy and the 2017 European Amateur Team Championship.

Helligkilde turned professional in late 2017 and joined the 2018 Nordic Golf League (NGL), where he recorded 10 top-10 finishes and secured his maiden professional title at the Ekerum Öland Masters in September. He finished fifth on the NGL Ranking to earn a Challenge Tour card for 2019.

With limited success on the 2019 Challenge Tour, he found himself back on the 2020 NGL where he won the Lumine Hills Open in Spain in February. He finished secondon the NGL Ranking and again earned a Challenge Tour card for 2021.

Helligkilde found success on the 2021 Challenge Tour and won two tournaments in quick succession, the Vierumäki Finnish Challenge and the Swiss Challenge. He climbed into third place on the Challenge Tour Ranking following his victory at the Swiss Challenge in October, with three tournaments left of the season.

Amateur wins
2015 Turkish Amateur Open Championship
2016 Hillerod Pokalen, Asserbo Pokalen

Source:

Professional wins (7)

Challenge Tour wins (3)

Challenge Tour playoff record (0–1)

Nordic Golf League wins (3)

Danish Golf Tour wins (1)

Team appearances
Amateur
European Amateur Team Championship (representing Denmark): 2016, 2017
Eisenhower Trophy (representing Denmark): 2016

See also
2021 Challenge Tour graduates

References

External links

Danish male golfers
1996 births
Living people